The Vancouver Volcanoes are a professional basketball team that plays in The Basketball League (TBL) based in Vancouver, Washington.  Previously, the team competed in the International Basketball League
The team has played at several arenas throughout their existence and will play in the O'Connell Sports Center.

History

International Basketball League (2005–2014)
The team's 2005 inaugural season was a huge disappointment. The team started 0–7, and went on to go 4–18. The Volcanoes were led in scoring by Charles McKinney (20.7 ppg). Again, despite high hopes, the Volcanoes were mediocre, posting a 4–21 record. Brad Lechtenberg led the team in scoring at 25.0 ppg. He and Kevin "Pip" Bloodsaw (19.6 ppg) were IBL All-Stars in 2006.

During the 2011 season the Vancouver Volcanoes began to show signs of success both on and off the court for team owner Bryan Hunter. The team won its first league title.  The franchise were runners-up in the 2013 and 2014 seasons before the IBL ceased operations in 2014. The Volcanoes played in the 2015 Portland Pro-Am before also ceasing operations.

Rebirth (2021–present)
On November 2, 2020, The Basketball League (TBL) announced the Portland Storm was approved as expansion franchise for the 2021 season owned by Curtis Hill. The team decided to sit out for the season due to the COVID-19 pandemic. 
Prior to the 2022 season, former team owner of the Vancouver Volcanoes, Bryan Hunter sold the team's image and rights to Curtis Hill, who relocated his Portland Storm to Vancouver Washington.

Season-by-season

Coaching roster

References

External links
Official website

International Basketball League teams
Sports in Vancouver, Washington
Basketball teams in Washington (state)
Basketball teams established in 2005
2005 establishments in Washington (state)
The Basketball League teams